In geometry, the elongated pentagonal orthocupolarotunda is one of the Johnson solids. As the name suggests, it can be constructed by elongating a pentagonal orthocupolarotunda by inserting a decagonal prism between its halves. Rotating either the cupola or the rotunda through 36 degrees before inserting the prism yields an elongated pentagonal gyrocupolarotunda.

Formulae
The following formulae for volume and surface area can be used if all faces are regular, with edge length a:

References

External links
 

Johnson solids